Cyclophyllum coprosmoides , also known as Coast Canthium, Supple Jack, and Sweet Susie, is a shrub or tree occurring in eastern Australia. It is commonly seen growing in a variety of different rainforest situations, from Jervis Bay in New South Wales to the islands of the Torres Strait.

Description 
Growing up to 15 metres tall, the species is more often encountered as a tall shrub in subtropical rainforest, monsoon forest and littoral rainforest.

Fragrant white flowers form from January to March, turning golden brown with age. The fruit is a fleshy orange/red drupe, around 8 mm long. Seen from October to December. Within the fruit are often two seeds, one each within the two lobes of the hard capsule, surrounded by the glossy red aril. The mature fruit are edible.

References

coprosmoides
Flora of Queensland
Flora of New South Wales
Trees of Australia
Taxa named by Ferdinand von Mueller